Diomandè Yann Cedric Gondo (born 25 November 1996) is an Ivorian professional footballer who plays as a forward for  club Ascoli, on loan from Cremonese.

Early life 
Gondo was born in Divo, in the south of the Ivory Coast; at age seven he moved to Italy with his family, settling in Casier, in the province of Treviso.

Career
Gondo began his youth career with Fiorentina. On 24 August 2015, he was sent on loan with the right of purchase to Serie B side Ternana. He made his professional debut on 6 September against Trapani, replacing Fabio Ceravolo in the 74th minute. Gondo scored his first goal with Ternana on 12 December against Como. He ended the season scoring two goals in 25 appearances.

On 9 August 2016, Gondo was signed by Asteras Tripolis, with whom he signed a four-year contract. He made his debut in the Super League Greece on 25 September against Atromitos, coming on as a substitute in the 34th minute of the second half in place of Pablo Mazza.

On 2 September 2019, after some experiences in Serie C, he was signed by Lazio, who sent him on loan to Salernitana. Starting as a reserve, he gradually carved out a place as a starter under Gian Piero Ventura, scoring six goals – including the goal that allowed his side to win 2–1 in the derby against Juve Stabia – and making nine assists.

On 30 January 2022, Gondo signed with Cremonese. On 10 August 2022, he moved on loan to Ascoli, with an option to buy.

Style of play 
Gondo is a versatile centre-forward, whose main characteristics are his physicality, agility, and aerial play.

Personal life 
Gondo is known for having participated in both seasons of MTV's reality TV show , when he was a Fiorentina youth player.

References

External links
 

1996 births
People from Divo, Ivory Coast
Living people
Ivorian footballers
Association football forwards
A.S.D. Albignasego Calcio players
ACF Fiorentina players
Ternana Calcio players
Asteras Tripolis F.C. players
Delfino Pescara 1936 players
S.S. Teramo Calcio players
F.C. Rieti players
S.S. Lazio players
U.S. Salernitana 1919 players
U.S. Cremonese players
Ascoli Calcio 1898 F.C. players
Serie B players
Serie C players
Super League Greece players
Ivorian expatriate footballers
Ivorian expatriate sportspeople in Italy
Ivorian expatriate sportspeople in Greece
Expatriate footballers in Italy
Expatriate footballers in Greece